Orlando Ortega Alejo (born 29 July 1991) is a Cuban-born Spanish track and field athlete who competes in the 110 metres hurdles. His personal best for the event is 12.94 seconds and he was the silver medallist at the 2016 Olympics.

Career
Ortega gradually rose through Cuba's ranks from 2007 onwards, taking youth and junior national titles in the hurdles. Ortega's grandmother and his first coach was Cristina Hechavarria, a 4 × 100 meter relay gold medalist at the Athletics at the 1967 Pan American Games. She died when Ortega was young, and in memory of her kept all his medals at her house. He was chosen to compete at the 2010 World Junior Championships in Athletics, but did not finish his heat. In his first year of senior competition in 2011, he established himself nationally with a win at the Barrientos Memorial meeting, winning with a personal best of 13.56 seconds. He improved further at a meeting in Havana running a time of 13.29 seconds. He was one hundredth of a second off his best in the final at the 2011 Pan American Games and claimed the bronze medal while fellow Cuban Dayron Robles took the title.

He competed on the European indoor circuit in early 2012; the highlight of the season was a second-place finish at the XL Galan and a 60 metres hurdles best of 7.57 seconds in Metz. He narrowly missed out on making the final at the 2012 IAAF World Indoor Championships, coming fifth in his heat. He began training under hurdles coach Santiago Antúnez, alongside Dayron Robles, and defeated his partner for the first time in Havana in May, improving his 110 m hurdles time to 13.09 seconds to become the third fastest Cuban ever in the event. He came third at the Adidas Grand Prix in New York in June.  He came in sixth in the final 110m hurdles at the 2012 Summer Olympics.

He was studying a degree in physical education in Cuba.

During the 2013 World Championships in Moscow, he defected from Cuba
and has competed for Spain since September 2013. International Association of Athletics Federations (IAAF) ruled he was not allowed to represent Spain officially until November 2016 — three full years after he officially became a Spanish resident – so he originally wasn't able to take part at the 2016 Summer Olympics. Eventually he was allowed to compete in the 2016 Summer Olympics and took home a silver medal in the 110m hurdles behind Omar McLeod.

Ortega won the bronze medal at the 2018 European Championships.

At the 2019 World Championships, Ortega qualified for the final, but finished 5th after Omar McLeod stumbled into him and arrested his momentum. Ortega was in second place until the incident. After an appeal by the Spanish Federation, the IAAF awarded him with a bronze medal.

Competition record

References

External links

 
 
 
 

Living people
1991 births
Cuban male hurdlers
Naturalised citizens of Spain
Spanish male hurdlers
Athletes (track and field) at the 2011 Pan American Games
Athletes (track and field) at the 2012 Summer Olympics
Athletes (track and field) at the 2016 Summer Olympics
Olympic athletes of Cuba
Olympic athletes of Spain
Pan American Games medalists in athletics (track and field)
Pan American Games bronze medalists for Cuba
Olympic silver medalists for Spain
Olympic silver medalists in athletics (track and field)
Medalists at the 2016 Summer Olympics
Defecting sportspeople of Cuba
Cuban emigrants to Spain
World Athletics Championships athletes for Spain
World Athletics Championships athletes for Cuba
Olympic male hurdlers
European Championships (multi-sport event) bronze medalists
European Athletics Championships medalists
Diamond League winners
Spanish Athletics Championships winners
Medalists at the 2011 Pan American Games
People from Artemisa